German submarine U-302 was a Type VIIC U-boat of Nazi Germany's Kriegsmarine during World War II. The submarine was laid down on 2 April 1941 at the Flender Werke yard at Lübeck as yard number 302, launched on 25 April 1942 and commissioned on 16 June under the command of Kapitänleutnant Herbert Sackel.

During her career, the U-boat sailed on eight combat patrols, sinking three ships, before she was sunk on 6 April 1944 in mid-Atlantic by a British frigate.

She was a member of ten wolfpacks.

Design
German Type VIIC submarines were preceded by the shorter Type VIIB submarines. U-302 had a displacement of  when at the surface and  while submerged. She had two shafts and two  propellers.

U-302 was fitted with five  torpedo tubes (four fitted at the bow and one at the stern), fourteen torpedoes, one  SK C/35 naval gun, 220 rounds, and a  C/30 anti-aircraft gun. The boat had a complement of between forty-four and sixty.

Service history
The boat's service life began with training with the 8th U-boat Flotilla in May 1942. She was then transferred to the 11th flotilla for operations on 1 December. She was reassigned to the 13th flotilla on 1 June 1943 and moved again to the 9th flotilla on 1 November.

The boat made the short journey from Kiel in Germany to Bergen in Norway, arriving on 1 December 1942.

First, second, third and fourth patrols
The submarine's first patrol began with her departure from Bergen on 2 January 1943.

Her fourth sortie finished in Narvik on 15 March 1943.

None of them was eventful.

The U-boat then made short voyages from Narvik to Trondheim to Hammerfest, (the latter lying in the far north of Norway).

Fifth and sixth patrols
Her fifth patrol took her around Bear Island, west of Svalbard, then around Bear Island again.

Her sixth effort was successful in that she sank the Soviet Dikson near Mona Island on 22 August 1943.

Seventh patrol
Leaving Trondheim on 6 December 1943, she passed through the gap between Iceland and the Faroe Islands. She arrived at La Pallice in occupied France, on 30 January 1944.

Eighth patrol and loss
Her last patrol was her most successful, sinking the Ruth I and the South America on 6 April 1944.

Fifty-one men died; there were no survivors.

Summary of raiding history

References

Bibliography

External links

German Type VIIC submarines
U-boats commissioned in 1942
U-boats sunk in 1944
World War II submarines of Germany
U-boats sunk by British warships
U-boats sunk by depth charges
1942 ships
Ships built in Lübeck
Ships lost with all hands
Maritime incidents in April 1944